Steven Robert Prest (1966 – 13 May 2009) was an English professional snooker player and coach.

Playing career
Prest competed on the professional snooker circuit in the 1990s before turning to full-time coaching.

His professional career spanned a total of seven seasons, bringing no success. Prest began his first season in 1991 ranked 149th in the world, which would be the highest position he would reach, and was relegated from the tour in 1997. Although he regained his place for the 1998–99 season, the highlight of Prest's career was reaching the last 64 of two ranking events - the 1991 Dubai Classic, where he lost 4–5 to Dene O'Kane, and the 1993 International Open, where he was defeated 1–5 by the veteran Eddie Charlton.

Coaching career

Prest worked with youngsters in his native Yorkshire and was an accredited World Snooker coach.

Prest was the manager and coach of Shaun Murphy, the 2005 World Snooker Champion.
 
In the early 2000s, he coached Neil Robertson of Australia, also working with Simon Bedford from Bradford. In addition to this, Prest became Ronnie O'Sullivan's long potting coach, in March 2009, but died at the end of May that year from peritonitis, aged 43.

External links 
Qualified World Snooker Coaches

References

1966 births
2009 deaths
English snooker players
Snooker coaches, managers and promoters
Date of birth missing
Sportspeople from Yorkshire
Deaths from peritonitis